The Honeymoon Tour was the second concert tour and the first arena tour by American singer Ariana Grande in support and to further promote her second studio album, My Everything (2014). It was officially announced on September 10, 2014. It traveled across North America, Europe, Asia and South America. The tour began on February 25, 2015, in Independence, Missouri, and concluded on October 25, 2015, in São Paulo, Brazil.

Background 
On June 5, 2014, about a month before the release of "Break Free", the second single from My Everything, Grande confirmed plans of a tour in support of the upcoming album on her Twitter account. Grande said that she had signed her tour contract and would be visiting continents other than North America, making it her first world tour. At the time, there were many rumors of a fellow recording artist, Iggy Azalea, joining her on tour after their success on Grande's track, "Problem", but these rumors were proven false when Grande and Azalea announced separate headlining tours in September and December, respectively.

About a week after the release of My Everything, on September 10, 2014, Grande officially announced the tour's title, which is a reference to the opening track of her first album, Yours Truly (2013), and the tour's North American leg. The first leg, which was promoted by Live Nation, visited 26 cities across North America beginning on February 25, 2015, in Independenceand concluding on April 16, 2015, in Vancouver, British Columbia, Canada. Tickets for the first leg went on sale to the general public on September 20, 2014, through Live Nation's website. Supporting acts for the North American leg included the English pop rock band Rixton, who were promoting their first album, Let the Road (2015), and the Norwegian electronic dance music DJ Cashmere Cat.

The European leg of the tour was announced on November 17, 2014, about a week after Grande's performance and multiple wins at the 2014 MTV Europe Music Awards, in Glasgow, Scotland. The second leg started on May 14, 2015, in Paris and ended a month later on June 16, 2015, in Barcelona. Tickets for the second leg became available to the public four days after the announcement, on November 21, 2014.

In the months leading up to the tour, Grande had been publicly tweeting to her followers from rehearsals teasing them about the tour. To show her devotion for the tour, Grande tweeted, "These rehearsals are kicking my ass but I love it. Really want to make this show the best I'm capable of." Grande also shared a video from rehearsals that features her practicing with Mi.Mu Gloves, which she will be using onstage during her performances. Mi.Mu Gloves, which were designed and created by Imogen Heap, are used to alter the wearer's voice by moving their hands in different directions. In the rehearsal video, Grande can be seen singing chords from songs such as "Why Try" while practicing with the technologically advanced gloves. In another rehearsal video posted on the tour's official YouTube page, Grande shared the band arrangement of "One Last Time", the fifth and final single from My Everything, which includes an extended string introduction and a raised key change.

On February 25, 2015, Grande shared an Instagram video of a conversation between herself and her now-deceased grandfather, in which he gives her advice and shows support for her career. It was then revealed during the opening night show that the video is a part of a tribute dedicated to Grande's grandfather that takes place during every concert before she sings the ballad "My Everything". Also during the opening night of the tour, Cashmere Cat debuted a new collaboration between himself and Grande, which they had hinted at on Twitter weeks before the tour officially started. About a week after the tour had started, the song, officially titled "Adore", was released to iTunes and became available to stream on Vevo on March 3, 2015.

Commercial reception 
Shortly after the tickets for the first leg went on sale, Forbes noted increasingly huge ticket prices for the tour. Jesse Lawrence reported that the average ticket price for the tour was about $225 on the secondary market after a couple of days of being on sale. He also mentioned that the most expensive date for the tour was in New York City with a price of $341, which was 51% above the tour's ticket average on the secondary market. Also in his report, Lawrence mentioned that the cheapest show, in Dallas, had an average ticket price of $191, which was only 15% below the tour's average price per ticket on the secondary market. Also noted in the article was that the rising ticket prices of Grande's tour had surpassed the ticket prices of Katy Perry and Lady Gaga. Tickets for Perry's Prismatic World Tour (2014–2015) averaged about $216 on the secondary market, which was 4% below Grande's tour average, and tickets for Gaga's ArtRave: The Artpop Ball (2014) were about $169 per ticket on the secondary market, which was around 25% lower than Grande's tour average at the time.

In the following months, the average ticket prices began to drop gradually. In late September 2014, the average price on the secondary market was $201 according to TiqIQ. The most expensive date on the secondary market had changed from New York City to San Jose at $456 per ticket. In January 2015, it was reported that the average ticket price on the secondary market had dropped again, to about $178 per ticket on the secondary market. By February 2015, the average ticket price for Grande's tour dropped to $168 per ticket. The most expensive date shifted back to New York City and the least expensive date changed from Dallas to Independence, with a price of $91, which was 44% below the tour's average price at the time. In comparison to other pop stars, Grande fell behind the likes of Perry and Taylor Swift, but managed to top other artists such as Meghan Trainor. Trainor's That Bass Tour (2015) averaged about $147 per ticket on the secondary market, which was 12.5% below Grande's average price per ticket. At the other end of the spectrum, Perry's tickets increased slightly to an average of $221 and Swift's tickets for the 1989 World Tour (2015) were $294 per ticket on the secondary market.

At the end of 2015, the tour was placed at number 40 on Pollstars "2015 Year-End Top 100 Worldwide Tours" list, grossing $41.8 million from 81 shows with a total attendance of 808,667.

Critical response 
In a positive review of the opening show in Independence, Timothy Finn of The Kansas City Star praised Grande for her energy and enthusiasm when singing and dancing along with her crew. Finn described the show as an "extravagant mix of music, dance, lasers, videos, pyrotechnics, and costume changes, akin to the kinds of audio-visual spectacles delivered by fellow pop-divas like Katy Perry and Britney Spears". He also noted that, even though Grande claimed to be nervous, it did not show. One complaint made by Finn was the level of volume in the arena. He wrote, "The sound was an issue at times, mostly due to high volume." He went on to say, "During a few songs, it was so loud her voice was hard to hear over the music and other noise and lyrics were hard to decipher."

In another positive review, Jhon Moser of The Morning Call wrote, "Grande's concert at Philadelphia's was very good largely because of her voice," and said, "She's simply one of the most pristine, technically talented singers in all of music." Moser went on to say, "From the opening 'Bang Bang,' she immediately showed off her singing chops, offering skyrocket vocals amid actual fireworks." Moser enjoyed the show, but said "despite its grandeur, that presentation never upstaged the music. The biggest reason for that was that Grande's four-octave voice was more than grand in itself – high and clear, hitting an ethereal note, and even doing some speedy rapping, on "Be My Baby." Morse too praised Grande for her "stratospheric vocals" on Pink Champagne's performance. He continued on to say that "Grande clearly feels comfortable in her talent. She danced free-spirited and without inhibition, even in tall black heels on "Break Your Heart Right Back." Moser liked the idea of making a proper show, "she successfully walked the line between sensuous and appropriate for the largely young-teen audience" and said "she also succeeded in making the concert classy instead of hyper-sexualized as most post-Disney and Nickelodeon singers have".

Piet Levy of the Milwaukee Journal Sentinel criticized the show heavily by writing that Grande "isn't ready for the big leagues". Elaborating on his comment, Levy went on to say that the performance "didn't signify the birth of the next superstar. Most of the time, it felt like a dress rehearsal". Levy continued to pick apart the performance by stating it was "uninspired and misguided", while also commenting that Grande's "confused, uncertain, insecure" presence throughout the show. He also noted that Grande seemingly held back vocally on songs such as "Bang Bang" and "Why Try", which he also criticized for the use of the Mi.Mu Gloves writing, "Who honestly thought chopping up and electronically manipulating Grande's pretty voice was a good idea?" Despite the harsh criticism, Levy applauded Grande for her "sensational vocals" during performances of the ballads "My Everything" and "Just a Little Bit of Your Heart".

In another mixed review from Jon Bream of the Star Tribune, Bream simply stated, "Grande's not big enough to pull off [an] arena spectacle." He continued to say that the performance "was too busy, dimly lit and just ill conceived". He also felt that "the emphasis should have been on the vocals, Grande's forte, and not on overcooked attempts at pizazz". Then he said, praising the singer, "What you want from Grande in concert is grand vocalizing, that four-octave range cascading with deep emotion. At times, it was evident, especially when there were no dancers onstage." He went on to compare some of the tour's aspects to the likes of Katy Perry, Cher and Madonna, but not in a positive way. He also disliked the use of the Mi.Mu Gloves, writing, "With such a terrific voice in an era of few stand-out female voices, why would Grande want to muck things up with technology?" Bream too praised Grande for her outstanding vocals on the track "Just a Little Bit of Your Heart", writing, "It was her most focused and heartfelt vocal of the evening." Bream complimented Grande on her "prodigious pipes" during up-tempo pieces such as "Love Me Harder". "Grande displayed her prodigious pipes on up-tempo pieces, too, including "Love Me Harder", which started with her alone atop a pedestal that rose at the back of the stage."

Set list 
This set list is of the concert on February 28, 2015. It does not represent all concerts for the duration of the tour.

 "Bang Bang"
 "Hands On Me"
 "Baby I”
 "Best Mistake"
 "Break Your Heart Right Back"
 "Be My Baby"
 "Right There"
 "The Way"
 "Pink Champagne"
 "Tattooed Heart"
 "One Last Time"
 "Why Try"
 "My Everything"
 "Just a Little Bit of Your Heart"
 “Lovin’ It” 
 "Love Me Harder"
 "All My Love"
 "Honeymoon Avenue"
 "Break Free"
Encore
 "Problem"

Shows

|December 31, 2015
|Las Vegas
|United States 
|The Colosseum at Caesars Palace

Cancelled shows

Notes

References 

2015 concert tours
Ariana Grande concert tours
Concert tours of North America
Concert tours of the United States
Concert tours of Canada
Concert tours of Mexico
Concert tours of Europe
Concert tours of the United Kingdom
Concert tours of South America
Concert tours of Asia
Concert tours of Japan